Momence Township is one of seventeen townships in Kankakee County, Illinois, USA.  As of the 2010 census, its population was 3,820 and it contained 1,655 housing units.  Momence Township is one of the original six townships of Kankakee County, Illinois; when first created the township encompassed land now in Sumner, Ganeer, and Pembroke Townships.  It was a township of Will County until Kankakee County was created.

Geography

Cities, towns, villages
 Momence (east half)

Unincorporated towns
 Ahern at 
 Edgetown at 
 Garden of Eden at 
 Illiana Heights at 
 Lake at 
 Litchfield at 
 Log Cabin Camp at 
 River at 
 Shadow Lawn at 
 Ward at 
 Woodland at 
(This list is based on USGS data and may include former settlements.)

Adjacent townships
 Yellowhead Township (north)
 West Creek Township, Lake County, Indiana (northeast)
 Lake Township, Newton County, Indiana (east)
 Pembroke Township (south)
 Ganeer Township (west)
 Sumner Township (northwest)

Cemeteries
The township contains these two cemeteries: Saint Judes and Shrontz.

Major highways
  Illinois Route 114

Airports and landing strips
 Johnson Airport

Rivers
 Kankakee River

Lakes
 Mirror Lake

Landmarks
 Island Park

Demographics

Government
The township is governed by an elected Town Board of a Supervisor and four Trustees.  The Township also has an elected Assessor, Clerk, Highway Commissioner and Supervisor.  The Township Office is located at 203 East River Street, Momence, IL 60954.

Political districts
 Illinois's 11th congressional district
 State House District 79
 State Senate District 40

School districts
 Momence Community Unit School District 1

References
 
 United States Census Bureau 2007 TIGER/Line Shapefiles
 United States National Atlas

External links
 Kankakee County Official Site
 City-Data.com
 Illinois State Archives

Townships in Kankakee County, Illinois
Populated places established in 1853
Townships in Illinois